"Ghar More Pardesiya" is a song from the 2019 Bollywood film Kalank. The song is sung by Shreya Ghoshal and composed by Pritam Chakraborty. The lyrics were penned by Amitabh Bhattacharya. The accompanying video features Madhuri Dixit, Alia Bhatt, and Varun Dhawan. A radio edit was also released, with Vaishali Mhade providing supporting vocals. Ghoshal and Mhade had previously collaborated in 2015, singing "Pinga" for the 2015 movie Bajirao Mastani.

Development
"Ghar More Pardesiya" was mixed and mastered by Shadab Rayeen at Newedge in Mumbai. It was arranged and programmed by Prasad Sashte and the choreography was done by Remo D'Souza in a classical style.

Release
The video was released on the official YouTube page of Zee Music Company on 19 March 2019. The audio version was also released simultaneously across various audio platforms including Spotify, Saavn, Gaana, Amazon Prime Music, Zee5, Wynk Music, iTunes, Apple Music, and others.

Music video
The video features Madhuri Dixit, Alia Bhatt, and Varun Dhawan. It involves Dixit singing a classical Ramayana bhajan and training a group of dancers, while Bhatt and Dhawan are seen roaming around a fair depicting the Ramayana story.

Chart performance
The song debuted on the Mirchi Music Top 20 countdown on 30 March 2019 in 6th position. It rose to 3rd position in the next few weeks and stayed in the chart for 4 weeks, out of which it was in Top 5 for more than 3 consecutive weeks.

Accolades
Screen Awards for Best Female Playback Singer (2019): Winner
Mirchi Music Award for Female Vocalist of The Year   for Best Female Vocalist of The Year (2020): Winner
Filmfare Award for Best Female Playback Singer 2020): Nominee
Zee Cine Awards (2020): Winner
Best Composer of The Year in Mirchi Music Awards (2020): Nominated
12th Mirchi Music Awards (2020) Song Producer - Programming and Arranging Given to  DJ Phukan, Prasad Sashte, Prakash Peters, and Sunny MR: Winner

References 

Shreya Ghoshal songs
2019 songs
Hindi film songs
Hindi songs
Indian songs
Songs with music by Pritam Chakraborty
Songs with lyrics by Amitabh Bhattacharya